Meen is a surname. Notable people with the surname include:

 Arthur Meen (1924–2008), Canadian politician
 Margaret Meen (died 1824), English watercolour painter
 Reggie Meen (1907–1984), British boxer
 Sally Meen (born 1965), English television presenter

See also
 McMeen